Eupithecia inoueata is a moth in the family Geometridae. It is found in Nepal, north-eastern India and Bhutan.

The wingspan is about 20 mm. The forewings are white, the costal area suffused with pale olive brown scales. The transverse lines are marked with dark purple-brown scales. The hindwings are shining white.

References

Moths described in 2005
inoueata
Moths of Asia